WQWQ-LD (channel 9) is a low-power television station in Paducah, Kentucky, United States, affiliated with MeTV. It relays the fourth digital subchannel of Cape Girardeau, Missouri–licensed dual CBS/CW affiliate KFVS-TV (channel 12) which is owned by Gray Television. WQWQ-LD's transmitter is located northwest of Egypt Mills, in unincorporated Cape Girardeau County, Missouri; its parent station maintains studios in the Hirsch Tower on Broadway Avenue in downtown Cape Girardeau.

WQWQ-LD originally operated as a translator of WQTV-LP (channel 24) in Murray, Kentucky, which broadcast from 1988 to 2019. This station's transmitter was located on Midway Road, along US 641, in unincorporated Calloway County, Kentucky.

From 2006 to 2021, WQTV-LP/WQWQ-LP served as the CW affiliate for the Paducah–Cape Girardeau–Harrisburg television market. For identification purposes, it is the WQWQ call sign that is used in the logo even though WQTV had more broadcasting power and was the first of the two stations to sign on.

Due to WQTV-LP/WQWQ-LP's low-power status, their signals only covered the immediate areas surrounding Murray and Paducah. Therefore, KFVS-TV's second digital subchannel served as that purpose which greatly extended their off-air reach throughout Western Kentucky's Jackson Purchase, Southeastern Missouri, Southern Illinois, and Northwest Tennessee.

MeTV programming previously aired on WQTV-LP and WQWQ-LP on a primary basis, from September 12, 2011 to January 1, 2020, when it was moved to a newly-created fourth digital subchannel of KFVS-TV. WQWQ-LP/KFVS-DT2 then operated like a traditional CW-affiliated station, outside of network programming time slots.

History
WQTV-LP launched on November 30, 1990 as W46BE and was known on-air as "TV 46". It was designed to be a sister outlet for radio station WNBS (1340 AM) and had studios in downtown Murray's Court Square. During its infancy, the channel was affiliated at various times with the All News Channel, FamilyNet, and Channel America. After its corporate bankruptcy, the license was sold to Jackson Purchase Broadcasting, owners of WSJP-AM 1130 and WBLN-FM 103.7. The call letters were changed to WQTV-LP on August 14, 1995, and it became a WB affiliate, replacing the superstation feed of Chicago's WGN-TV as the network's affiliate in Southern Illinois. The station was then sold to Murray State University which continued to operate it as a for-profit enterprise.

Eventually, the channel assignment was changed from 46 to 24 and MSU sold the station to current owner Raycom Media in 2004. In 2000, WQTV-LP switched affiliations with WDKA and became a UPN affiliate. During this period, the station was known on-air as "UPN The Beat". On January 24, 2006, The WB and UPN announced that they would end broadcasting and merge. The newly combined network would be called The CW. The letters would represent the first initial of its corporate parents: CBS (the parent company of UPN) and the Warner Bros. unit of Time Warner. On February 22, News Corporation announced that it would start up another new network called MyNetworkTV. This new service, which would be a sister network to Fox, would be operated by Fox Television Stations and its syndication division 20th Television.

MyNetworkTV was created in order to give UPN and WB stations, not mentioned as becoming CW affiliates, another option besides becoming independent. It was also created to compete against The CW. WDKA joined MyNetworkTV on September 5, while on September 18, WQTV-LP became part of The CW. The channel re-branded as "Heartland's CW" and began to be offered on a second digital subchannel of KFVS. This was done to extend its broadcasting radius. By law, the two were not obligated to make the switch on June 12, 2009 due to their low-powered status.

WQWQ-LP and WQTV-LP were both obligated to convert to digital by July 13, 2021 as part of the Digital TV transition for low-powered TV stations. In early 2015, a construction permit was issued for both WQTV-LP and WQWQ-LP to convert to digital.

WQTV-LP went off the air in 2019, and Gray Television surrendered its license for cancellation on February 10, 2021.

On June 22, 2021, WQWQ-LP was licensed for digital operation, and changed its call sign to WQWQ-LD.

MeTV affiliation
On September 12, 2011, WQWQ-LP added MeTV through a primary affiliation agreement. The channel would provide parts of a simulcast of MeTV programming during different times of the day while the rest of the day would be The CW's prime time lineup along with syndicated, news and original programming. This would be the case until in December 2019 when KFVS announced they would be updating their technology and move MeTV to its own newly created subchannel on 12.4, ending eight years of secondary operations on WQWQ-LP. On January 1, 2020, around 3 a.m. (CT), MeTV switched off their secondary operations after an episode of Barnaby Jones leading to infomercials.

Newscasts
At one point in time, KFVS produced a nightly prime time newscast on WQTV-LP/WQWQ-LP. Known as Heartland News at 9, the show could be seen for a half-hour and was targeted specifically at a Southeastern Missouri audience. It competed with another broadcast in the time slot on Fox affiliate KBSI which also aired every night for thirty minutes. However, that program was produced by NBC affiliate WPSD-TV so it featured more of a regionalized summary of headlines since it originated from the NBC outlet's facility in Kentucky.

The WQTV-LP/WQWQ-LP newscast was dropped on July 29, 2007 after nearly eight years. KFVS-DT2 currently replays three weekday newscasts from KFVS including the 6 a.m. hour of The Breakfast Show (at 7), Heartland News at Noon (at 1 p.m.), and Heartland News at 10 (at 11 p.m.). The Sunday edition of The Breakfast Show is also repeated on the subchannel.

Subchannels

References

External links
KFVS-TV

Television channels and stations established in 1999
1999 establishments in Kentucky
Television stations in the Paducah–Cape Girardeau–Harrisburg market
Gray Television
MeTV affiliates
Low-power television stations in the United States
Paducah, Kentucky